Dong or DONG may refer to:

Places
 Dong Lake, or East Lake, a lake in China
 Dong, Arunachal Pradesh, a village in India
 Dong (administrative division) (동 or 洞), a neighborhood division in Korea

Persons
Queen Dong (1623–1681), princess consort of Koxinga and mother of Zheng Jing
Empress Dong (Ran Min's wife), wife of Ran Min, emperor of Chinese state Ran Wei
Empress Dowager Dong (died 189), empress dowager during Han dynasty
Dǒng (surname) or 董, a Chinese surname
Dōng (surname) or 東, a Chinese surname

Entertainment
 Dong (film) (东), a documentary film by Jia Zhangke.  
 Dong Open Air, a heavy metal festival in Germany.
 D!NG (previously Do Online Now Guys, or DONG), a YouTube channel created and hosted by Michael Stevens
 DONG, a former segment of the Vsauce, Vsauce2, Vsauce3 and WeSauce channels, created by Michael Stevens

Other uses
 Dong people, an ethnic minority group of China
 Dong language (China)
 Dong language (Nigeria)
 Vietnamese đồng, a unit of currency
 Ørsted (company), a Danish energy company formerly known as DONG Energy
 Danish Cup or DONG Cup, a trophy sponsored by the oil company from 2000 to 2004
 Dong, a slang term for the human penis
 Dong, an internet slang term for the character Donkey Kong derived from the meme "Expand Dong," which is an edited picture of the game Donkey Kong 64'''s box art

See also
 Dong quai, a medicinal herb
 Lá dong or Phrynium placentarium, a type of prayer-plant
 Long Duk Dong or "the Donger," a character in Sixteen Candles''
 Rodong-1, a type of North Korean missiles
 Taepodong (disambiguation)

Language and nationality disambiguation pages